Faulk may refer to:

People
Andrew Jackson Faulk (1814–1898), 3rd Governor of Dakota Territory
Clarence Faulk (1909–2010), American journalist and broadcaster
John Henry Faulk (1913–1990), American radio show host
Justin Faulk (born 1992), American ice hockey player
Kevin Faulk (born 1976), American football player
Larry Faulk (Abdul Salaam (football player)), NFL football player
Marshall Faulk (born 1973), NFL American football player
Mary Lena Faulk (1926–1995), American professional golfer
Mike Faulk, American politician from Tennessee
Trev Faulk (born 1981), American footballer

Places
Faulk County, South Dakota
Faulkton, South Dakota

See also
Faulks
Falk (disambiguation)